Astrid Strauss or, rarely, Strauß (born 24 December 1968 in Berlin) is a former freestyle swimmer from East Germany, who won the silver medal in the 800 m freestyle at the 1988 Summer Olympics in Seoul, South Korea.

In May 1992,  she tested positive for testosterone and was suspended from competition.

See also
 List of German records in swimming

References

1968 births
Living people
East German female freestyle swimmers
Olympic silver medalists for East Germany
Olympic swimmers of East Germany
Swimmers from Berlin
Swimmers at the 1988 Summer Olympics
People from East Berlin
World record setters in swimming
Medalists at the 1988 Summer Olympics
World Aquatics Championships medalists in swimming
European Aquatics Championships medalists in swimming
Recipients of the Patriotic Order of Merit in gold
Olympic silver medalists in swimming
German sportspeople in doping cases
Doping cases in swimming